4V or 4-V may refer to:

4V, abbreviation for 4 volts
4V, abbreviation for 4-valve engine
4V, IATA code for Birdy Airlines 
Venera 4V-2 spacecraft
Sun-4v, a model of Sun-4 workstation
6AL-4V, a type of titanium alloy
4V, a model of Toyota V engine
4V, abbreviation for QuatroV - TV Show
4V, the production code for the 1977 Doctor Who serial Horror of Fang Rock
4V: an ITU prefix for Haiti

See also
V4 (disambiguation)